Juan Pablo Espinosa (born 28 October 1980 in Bogotá) is a Colombian actor.

Biography 
After graduating from Gimnasio Moderno high-school in Bogotá, Espinosa went to study acting at Boston's Emerson College. He also lived in New York City and Los Angeles, before returning to Colombia in 2004. In 2005 he debuted in Colombian television at Caracol TV daily anthology series Tu voz estéreo. Later, he appeared in RCN TV telenovelas Merlina, mujer divina and Floricienta; after a break, he became part of the ensemble cast of El último matrimonio feliz and of the Colombian theatre version of Closer. In 2009 he participated in the first season of Sony Pictures Television and Caracol TV series Los caballeros las prefieren brutas, and on A corazón abierto, a RCN TV series based on Grey's Anatomy. He would return to Caracol TV for a supporting role on Secretos de familia and as a star on El secretario.

In June 2019 he came out as gay.

Television roles

References

External links 
 

1980 births
Colombian male television actors
Living people
Gay actors
Colombian LGBT actors